Krzysztof Perwanger (1700–1785) was a Polish sculptor and mayor.

Perwanger came to Tolkmicko about 1735. There he became a brewer, and in 1746 he was a senior member of the local beer guild. In 1758 he became the mayor of Tolkmicko. He lived in Tolkmicko until 1761. After briefly living in Königsberg, at the end of his life he settled permanently in Reszel. Perwanger was married twice. Since 1741 he was married to Feldkeller Elizabeth. After her death in 1759, he married Dorothy Meschele. He had a son John Christopher with his first wife.

Perwanger's sculptural techniques were influenced by the workshop of Antoniego Kornowskiego in Tolkmicko. He pioneered Rococo in Warmia. His works have been executed in plaster, marble, sandstone, wood and ivory. Perwanger's workshop produced figural sculptures and woodcarving works in the pulpit, confessionals and decorations for local churches.

References
 Tadeusz Oracki, "Biographical Dictionary of Prussia and Earth Malbork from the mid-fifteenth to the late eighteenth century L-Z", the Centre for Scientific Research. Wojciech Kętrzyński in Olsztyn, Olsztyn, 1988.
 Andrew Rzempołuch, "Guide to the monuments of art of former East Prussia," Publishing Agency "Remix", Olsztyn, 1992, .
 John Flogging, Dictionary of Warmia, Publisher litter, Olsztyn, 2002, 
 Andrew Rzempołuch, about four sculptures of Christopher Pervangera in Warmia, "Bulletin of the History of Art" XLIX: 1988, No. 1-2, pp. 113–120, 8 fig.

Polish sculptors
Polish male sculptors
Polish painters
Polish male painters
1700 births
1775 deaths
People from Tyrol (state)